Raymond George Hanken (December 3, 1911 – November 29, 1980) was an American football end who played two seasons with the New York Giants of the National Football League. He played college football at George Washington University and attended Sacred Heart High School in Oelwein, Iowa.

References

External links
Just Sports Stats

1911 births
1980 deaths
Players of American football from Iowa
American football ends
George Washington Colonials football players
New York Giants players
People from Oelwein, Iowa